The Hangover is a 2009 American comedy film directed by Todd Phillips, co-produced with Daniel Goldberg, and written by Jon Lucas and Scott Moore. It is the first installment in The Hangover trilogy. The film stars Bradley Cooper, Ed Helms, Zach Galifianakis, Heather Graham, Justin Bartha, Ken Jeong, and Jeffrey Tambor. It tells the story of Phil Wenneck (Cooper), Stu Price (Helms), Alan Garner (Galifianakis), and Doug Billings (Bartha), who travel to Las Vegas for a bachelor party to celebrate Doug's impending marriage. However, Phil, Stu, and Alan wake up with Doug missing and no memory of the previous night's events, and must find the groom before the wedding can take place.

Lucas and Moore wrote the script after executive producer Chris Bender's friend disappeared and had a large bill after being sent to a strip club. After Lucas and Moore sold it to the studio for $2million, Phillips and Jeremy Garelick rewrote the script to include a tiger as well as a subplot involving a baby and a police cruiser, and also including boxer Mike Tyson. Filming took place in Nevada for 15 days, and during filming, the three main actors (Cooper, Helms, and Galifianakis) formed a real friendship.

The Hangover was released on June 5, 2009, and was a critical and commercial success. The film became the tenth-highest-grossing film of 2009, with a worldwide gross of over $467million. The film won the Golden Globe Award for Best Motion Picture – Musical or Comedy, and received multiple other accolades. It became the highest-grossing R-rated comedy ever in the United States, surpassing a record previously held by Beverly Hills Cop for almost 25 years.

A sequel, The Hangover Part II, was released on May 26, 2011, and a third and final installment, The Hangover Part III, was released on May 23, 2013. While both were also box-office hits, neither were well-received critically.

Plot

Two days before his wedding, Doug Billings, a cheerful yet careful bachelor, travels to Las Vegas with his best friends Phil Wenneck, a sarcastic elementary school teacher, Stu Price, an apprehensive dentist, and Alan Garner, his odd future brother-in-law. Sid, the father of Doug's fiancée Tracy, allows Doug to drive his vintage Mercedes-Benz W111. They get a suite at Caesars Palace and celebrate by sneaking onto the hotel rooftop and taking shots of Jägermeister. The next day, Phil, Stu and Alan awaken to find they have no memory of the previous night. Doug is nowhere to be found, Stu's tooth is missing, the suite is a mess, a Bengal tiger is in the bathroom, and a baby is in the closet. They see Doug's mattress impaled on a statue outside, and when they ask for their Mercedes, the valet delivers a Las Vegas police cruiser.

Retracing their steps, the trio travel to a hospital, discovering they were drugged with Rohypnol, causing their memory loss, and that they went to the hospital from a chapel the previous night. At the chapel, they learn that Stu married a call girl named Jade, despite being in a relationship with his domineering and philandering girlfriend Melissa. Outside the chapel, the trio is attacked by gangsters demanding to know where "he" is. Bewildered, they flee and track down Jade, the baby's mother.

They are arrested by the police for having stolen the cruiser. After being told that the Mercedes was impounded, the trio are released when they unwittingly volunteer to be targets for a taser demonstration. While driving the Mercedes, they discover a naked Chinese man named Leslie Chow in the trunk, who beats the trio with a crowbar and flees. Alan confesses that he drugged their drinks to ensure they had a good night, believing the drug to be Ecstasy.

Returning to their suite, they find Mike Tyson, who knocks Alan unconscious and orders them to return his tiger to his mansion. After Stu drugs it, they load it into the Mercedes, and drive to Tyson's mansion. However, the tiger awakens and attacks them, scratching Phil on the neck and damaging the car's interior. They push the car the rest of the way to the mansion and deliver the tiger to Tyson, who shows them security camera footage indicating they did not lose Doug until after they got back to the hotel. While driving back, their car is rammed by a black Cadillac Escalade manned by the gangsters from the chapel and Chow, their boss. Chow accuses them of kidnapping him and stealing $80,000 in poker chips. As they deny it, he tells them he has Doug, and threatens to kill him if the chips are not returned. Unable to find Chow's chips, Alan, with help from Stu and Jade, uses his knowledge of card counting to win $82,400 playing blackjack.

They meet Chow in the Mojave Desert to exchange the chips for Doug, only to find that the 'Doug' in question is actually the drug dealer who accidentally sold the roofies to Alan. With the real Doug's wedding set to occur in five hours, Phil calls Tracy to tell her they cannot find him. Simultaneously, the other Doug's remarks that someone who takes roofies is more likely to end up on the floor than on the roof cause Stu to realize where Doug is.

They travel back to Caesars Palace where they find a dazed and badly sunburned Doug on the roof. They moved him there on his mattress as a practical joke, but forgot when the roofies wore off; Doug threw the mattress onto the statue in an attempt to signal for help. Before leaving, Stu makes arrangements to meet Jade for a date the following week. With no flights available, the four drive home in the mangled Mercedes, where Doug reveals that he has Chow's original $80,000 in his pocket. Despite their late arrival, Doug and Tracy are married. At the wedding, Stu gleefully breaks up with Melissa. Alan finds Stu's digital camera containing photos of the debauchery from the night in Las Vegas, and the four agree to look at the pictures before deleting them.

Cast

Todd Phillips, the film's director, appears as Mr. Creepy, who appears briefly in an elevator. Professional skateboarder Mike Vallely portrays Neeco, the high-speed tuxedo delivery man. Las Vegas personalities Wayne Newton and Carrot Top appear as themselves in the photo slide show.

Production

Writing
The plot of The Hangover was inspired by a real event that happened to Tripp Vinson, a producer and friend of executive producer Chris Bender. Vinson had gone missing from his own Las Vegas bachelor party, blacking out and waking up "in a strip club being threatened with a very, very large bill I was supposed to pay".

Jon Lucas and Scott Moore sold the original script of The Hangover to Warner Bros. for over $2million. The story was about three friends who lose the groom at his Las Vegas bachelor party and then must retrace their steps to figure out what happened.
It was then rewritten by Jeremy Garelick and director Todd Phillips, who added additional elements such as Mike Tyson and his tiger, the baby, and the police cruiser. However, Lucas and Moore retained writing credit in accordance with the Writers Guild of America, West's screenwriting credit system.

Casting
Ed Helms, Zach Galifianakis, and Bradley Cooper were all casual acquaintances before The Hangover was filmed, which Helms said he believed helped in establishing a rapport and chemistry amongst their characters. Helms credited Phillips for "bringing together three guys who are really different, but really appreciate each others' humor and sensibilities". Helms also said the fact that the story of the three characters growing closer and bonding forged the friendship between the three actors: "As you spend 14hours a day together for three months, you see a lot of sides of somebody. We went through the wringer together, and that shared experience really made us genuine buddies."

Lindsay Lohan was in talks with Phillips for the role of Jade in the film but was ultimately not cast due to being considered too young for what was discussed.

Filming

On a budget of $35million, principal photography took place in Nevada for fifteen days.

The Hangover was mostly filmed on location at Caesars Palace, including the front desk, lobby, entrance drive, pools, corridors, elevators, and roof, but the suite damaged in the film was built on a soundstage.

Helms said filming The Hangover was more physically demanding than any other role he had done, and that he lost eight pounds while making the film. He said the most difficult day of shooting was the scene when Mr. Chow rams his car and attacks the main characters, which Helms said required many takes and was very painful, such as when a few of the punches and kicks accidentally landed and when his knees and shins were hurt while being pulled out of a window. The missing tooth was not created with prosthetics or visual effects, but is naturally occurring: Helms never had an adult incisor grow, and got a dental implant as a teenager, which was removed for filming.

Jeong stated that his jumping on Cooper's neck naked wasn't a part of the script, but rather improvisation on their part. It was added with Phillips' blessing. Jeong also stated that he had to receive his wife's permission to appear nude in the film.

Phillips tried to convince the actors to allow him to use a real Taser until Warner Bros. lawyers intervened.

Regarding the explicit shots in the final photo slide show in which his character is seen receiving fellatio in an elevator, Galifianakis confirmed that a prosthesis was used for the scene, and that he had been more embarrassed than anyone else during the creation of the shot. "You would think that I wouldn't be the one who was embarrassed; I was extremely embarrassed. I really didn't even want it in there. I offered Todd's assistant a lot of money to convince him to take it out of the movie. I did. But it made it in there."

The scenes involving animals were filmed mostly with trained animals. Trainers and safety equipment were digitally removed from the final version. Some prop animals were used, such as when the tiger was hidden under a sheet and being moved on a baggage cart. Such efforts were given an "Outstanding" rating by the American Humane Association for the monitoring and treatment of the animals.

Music

The film's score was composed by Christophe Beck. The film featured 20 songs, consisting of music by Kanye West, Danzig, The Donnas, Usher, Phil Collins, The Belle Stars, T.I., Wolfmother and The Dan Band, who tend to feature in Phillips' films as the inappropriate, bad-mouthed wedding band. The Dan Band's cover of the 50 Cent single "Candy Shop" appeared in Part I. Pro-skater and punk musician Mike Vallely was invited with his band, Revolution Mother, to write a song for the film and also makes a cameo appearance as the high speed tuxedo delivery guy.

"Right Round" by Flo Rida is played over the ending credits. The film uses the Kanye West song "Can't Tell Me Nothing" for which Zach Galifianakis made an alternative music video.

 Track listing

 Additional songs 
 "Who Let the Dogs Out?" – Baha Men
 "Right Round" – Flo Rida ft. Kesha
 "Can't Tell Me Nothing" – Kanye West
 "Live Your Life" – T.I. featuring Rihanna
 "What Do You Say?" – Mickey Avalon and Lil Jon 
 "Yeah!" – Usher featuring Ludacris and Lil Jon
 "Joker & the Thief" – Wolfmother

Release

Box office
The Hangover was a financial success. , it had grossed $467,416,722, of which $277,322,503 was in Canada and the United States. It was tenth-highest-grossing film of 2009 in the world, the ninth-highest-grossing film of 2009 in the U.S. and the highest-grossing R-rated comedy ever in the United States, surpassing a record previously held by Beverly Hills Cop for almost 25years.
Out of all R-rated films, it is the sixth-highest-grossing ever in the U.S., behind The Passion of the Christ, Deadpool, American Sniper, It and The Matrix Reloaded. However, adjusted for inflation The Hangover earned less than half the total earned by Beverly Hills Cop and is out grossed by several comedies, including Porky's.

On its first day of release in the U.S., the film drew $16,734,033 on approximately 4,500screens at 3,269sites, and exceeded the big-budgeted Land of the Lost—the other major new release of the weekend—for first day's box office takings.
Although initial studio projections had the Disney·Pixar film Up holding on to the number one slot for a second consecutive weekend, final revised figures, bolstered by a surprisingly strong Sunday showing, ultimately had The Hangover finishing first for the weekend, with $44,979,319 from3,269 theaters, averaging $13,759 per venue, narrowly edging out Up for the top spot, and more than twice that of Land of the Lost, which finished third with $18.8million.
The film exceeded Warner Bros.' expectations—which had anticipated it would finish third behind Up and Land of the Lost—benefiting from positive word-of-mouth and critical praise, and a generally negative buzz for Land of the Lost. It stayed at the number one position in its second weekend, grossing another $32,794,387, from 3,355theaters for an average of $9,775 per venue, and bringing the 10-day amount to $104,768,489.

Home media

The Hangover was released on DVD, Blu-ray, and UMD on December 15, 2009. There is a single-disc theatrical version featuring both fullscreen and widescreen options (DVD only), as well as a widescreen two-disc unrated version of the film, also containing the theatrical version (DVD, Blu-ray, and UMD). The unrated version is approximately seven minutes longer than the theatrical version. The unrated version is on disc one and the theatrical version, digital copy, and the different features are on disc two.
The Hangover beat Inglourious Basterds and G-Force in first week DVD and Blu-ray sales, as well as rentals, selling more than 8.6million units and making it the best-selling comedy ever on DVD and Blu-ray, beating the previous record held by My Big Fat Greek Wedding.

Reception

Critical response
On Rotten Tomatoes, The Hangover has an approval rating of 79% based on 240 reviews with an average rating of 6.8/10. The site's critical consensus reads, "With a clever script and hilarious interplay among the cast, The Hangover nails just the right tone of raunchy humor, and the non-stop laughs overshadow any flaw." On Metacritic, the film has a score of 73 out of 100 based on 31 critics, indicating "generally favorable reviews". Audiences polled by CinemaScore gave the film an average grade of "A" on an A+ to F scale.

Roger Ebert of the Chicago Sun-Times gave it three-and-a-half stars out of four and praised the film for its funniness and comedic approach. A. O. Scott of The New York Times praised Cooper, Helms and Galifianakis for their performances in the film as well as Todd Phillips for its direction. Scott later went on to say that the film is "safe as milk". Mick LaSalle of the San Francisco Chronicle also praised Phillips' direction. LaSalle also praised the film's comedic scenes and called it "the funniest movie so far this year [2009]". Betsy Sharkey of the Los Angeles Times praised the film for its perverseness. Sharkey also said that the film is "filled with moments as softhearted as they are crude, as forgiving as unforgivable". Although Joe Leydon of Variety criticized the film's trailers and TV-spots for its "beer-and-boobs, party-hearty farce", he also praised the film for its cleverness.

Conversely, Richard Corliss of Time said that "virtually every joke [in the film] either is visible long before it arrives or extends way past its expiration date" and added, "Whatever the other critics say, this is a bromance so primitive it's practically Bro-Magnon."
In his review in The Baltimore Sun, Michael Sragow called the film a "foul mesh of cheap cleverness and vulgarity." Joe Neumaier of the Daily News gave the film two-and-a-half out of five stars and noted, "Amusing as it is, it never feels real. That may not seem like a big deal—a lot of funny movies play by their own rules—except that The Hangover keeps doubling-down on the outlandishness."
Family-oriented reviewers have harangued the film, noting that Galifianakis said he tried to forbid his own mother from seeing it and that he yells at parents of kids who tell him they like the film.

Anton Trees criticised the film for what he viewed as the weak character development, especially in its female characters. Critics also focused on misogyny and stereotyping, in particular the portrayal of the Asian gangster.
Ebert, despite his praise, stated, "I won't go so far as to describe it as a character study", and said that the film is more than the sum of its parts—parts that may at first seem generic or clichéd, since similar films (such as Very Bad Things) have already explored the idea of a weekend in Vegas gone wrong. The film's premise has several similarities to Dude, Where's My Car? Both films are about "a couple guys waking up after a night of getting trashed, only to find they are missing something important", whose adventures include "a trail of clues, a missing car, dubious encounters with strippers and wild animals, a brush with the law and gangs chasing them for something they don't realize they have".

Accolades

On January 17, 2010, The Hangover won the Golden Globe Award for Best Motion Picture – Musical or Comedy.
It was also named one of the top ten films of the year by the American Film Institute.
The film won "Best Ensemble" from the Detroit Film Critics Society.

Impact and legacy 
By depicting and celebrating Las Vegas as the "ultimate guys' getaway", The Hangover had a major impact on Caesars Palace and Las Vegas. It was reported in 2013 that as of that year, guests were still continuing to quote to Caesars staff two lines from the film's check-in scene: "Did Caesar live here?" and "Do you know if the hotel is pager-friendly?" As a result of the film, Hangover-themed slot machines became popular at casinos throughout the Las Vegas Valley, the Caesars Palace gift shop sold tens of thousands of Hangover-related souvenirs, and the Las Vegas Convention and Visitors Authority received numerous inquiries from persons interested in recreating some of the film's most wild scenes, such as those involving a tiger.

The Las Vegas branch of Madame Tussauds added Hangover-themed rooms recreating the hotel room and the wedding chapel and a tie-in rooftop cocktail bar.

In 2018, Hasbro issued a parody version of their board game Clue where players have to locate a missing friend somewhere in the city after a wild night of carousing.

Sequels

Principal photography of The Hangover Part II began in October 2010, with Bradley Cooper, Ed Helms, Justin Bartha, and Zach Galifianakis returning, in addition to Ken Jeong who appears in a much larger role. The film was released on May 26, 2011.

Filming of The Hangover Part III began in September 2012, and was released on May 23, 2013.

See also
 List of films set in Las Vegas

References

External links

 
 
 
 The Hangover on FilmAffinity
 
 
 
 The Hangover – Behind-the-Scenes Secrets
 

2000s adventure comedy films
2000s buddy comedy films
2000s comedy road movies
2009 comedy films
2009 films
American adventure comedy films
American buddy comedy films
American comedy road movies
Best Musical or Comedy Picture Golden Globe winners
2000s English-language films
Films about drugs
Films about parties
Films about weddings
Films about missing people
Films directed by Todd Phillips
Films with screenplays by Jon Lucas and Scott Moore
Films produced by Todd Phillips
Films scored by Christophe Beck
Films set in Los Angeles
Films set in Nevada
Films set in the Las Vegas Valley
Films shot in Nevada
Films shot in the Las Vegas Valley
Legendary Pictures films
The Hangover (film series)
Triad films
Warner Bros. films
2000s American films
2000s Hong Kong films